The Torre delle Milizie ("Tower of the Militia") is a fortified tower in Rome, Italy, located between Trajan's Market in the Imperial fora to the southwest and the Pontifical University of Saint Thomas Aquinas, or Angelicum, to the east.

History
It gained the popular nickname of "Nero's Tower" from a tradition that it originated as an ancient Roman construction from which Emperor Nero watched the Great Fire of Rome – this is derived from the classical account that he watched from a tower in the Gardens of Maecenas, though more trustworthy accounts place him out of town, at Antium at the time. 

The actual construction of the tower probably dates to the time of Pope Innocent III (1198–1216) under the Aretino family. At the end of the 13th century, the tower was a possession of the powerful Annibaldi family, who were followed by the Prefetti di Vico and by the Caetani, Pope Boniface VIII's family. Under the Caetani the fortified quarter was enlarged and strengthened, probably rivalling with Castel Sant'Angelo as Rome's main fortress. 

At the end of the 13th century when Henry VII of Luxembourg came to Rome for his coronation as Holy Roman Emperor (May–June 1312), he chose the Torre delle Milizie as the base for his Ghibellines supporters.  Twenty years later the tower was ceded to the Conti. During their ownership, Raphael, in his role as curator of the antiquities of the city, cited the tower as an example of an edifice built reusing antique parts. The Conti held the tower until 1619, when it was acquired by the nuns of the neighboring convent (later demolished) of Santa Caterina a Magnanapoli.

In 1911, the tower was declared an Italian National Monument.

Architecture
One of the main medieval monuments of the city, the Torre delle Milizie is built on a square plan, its base sides measure  × . The 1348 earthquake also resulted in the slight tilting of the structure.

See also
List of leaning towers
Torre dei Conti

Sources

External links

Milizie
Towers completed in the 13th century
Inclined towers
Rome R. I Monti
Henry VII, Holy Roman Emperor